Jianxing Township is a township in Zitong County, Sichuan province, China. , it has seven villages under its administration.

See also 
 List of township-level divisions of Sichuan

References 

Township-level divisions of Sichuan
Zitong County